Desert broomrape can refer to several parasitic plants in the family Orobanchaceae, including:

 Cistanche deserticola
 Cistanche tubulosa
 Orobanche cooperi
 Orobanche ludoviciana